Young Woman at a Window is a 1925 oil on paper realist work by Salvador Dalí, produced in his youth. It shows the painter's sister Ana Maria, seen from behind in front of a window at Cadaqués. It is now in the Museo Reina Sofía, in Madrid.

References

1925 paintings
Paintings by Salvador Dalí
20th-century portraits
Portraits of women
Paintings in the collection of the Museo Nacional Centro de Arte Reina Sofía
Water in art